The 1946 Arkansas gubernatorial election was held on November 5, 1946.

Incumbent Democratic Governor Benjamin Travis Laney won re-election to a second term, defeating Republican nominee W. T. Mills with 84.14% of the vote.

Democratic primary

The Democratic primary election was held on July 30, 1946.

Candidates
Virgil R. Greene, attorney
Benjamin Travis Laney, incumbent Governor
James M. "Jim" Malone, former county judge

Results

General election

Candidates
Benjamin Travis Laney, Democratic
W. T. Mills, Republican, lawyer

Results

References

Bibliography
 
 

1946
Arkansas
Gubernatorial
November 1946 events in the United States